Sir George Oswald Reid  (22 July 1903 – 18 February 1993) was an Australian politician.

He was born in Hawthorn to railway officer George Watson Reid and Lillias Margaret Easton. He attended Camberwell Grammar School and Scotch College, and studied law at Melbourne University and in 1926 was admitted as a barrister and solicitor, practising at the bar until 1927 and as a solicitor thereafter. In 1947 he was elected to the Victorian Legislative Assembly as the Liberal member for Box Hill. He was party whip from 1950 to 1952, when he was defeated. Returned in 1955, he became cabinet secretary and minister without portfolio. In 1956 he became Minister of Labour and Industry, moving to Fuel and Power in 1965, and to Immigration (until 1970) and Attorney-General in 1967. He was leader of the Assembly from 1971 to 1972. Reid retired in 1973, having taken silk in 1971 and been knighted in 1972. He died in 1993.

References

1903 births
1993 deaths
Liberal Party of Australia members of the Parliament of Victoria
Members of the Victorian Legislative Assembly
Attorneys-General of Victoria
Australian King's Counsel
Australian Knights Bachelor
Politicians awarded knighthoods
20th-century Australian politicians
People from Hawthorn, Victoria
People educated at Camberwell Grammar School
People educated at Scotch College, Melbourne
Melbourne Law School alumni